Skäggstölden på Kråkebohöjden (Swedish for "The Beard Theft at Crow's Nest Heights") was the 1985 edition of Sveriges Radio's Christmas Calendar.

Plot
Kråkebohöjden is located on a minor hill beyond fourteen towns and fourteen mountains. It's December, and someone has stolen Santa Claus's beard.

Cassette tapes
In 1985, SR also released songs from the programme on  cassette tape.

References

1985 radio programme debuts
1985 radio programme endings
Sveriges Radio's Christmas Calendar